Al Gore has received a number of important awards and honors:

2017 awards and honors
2017 Honorary Doctorate, University of Melbourne

2012 awards and honors
2012 Inaugural member of the Internet Hall of Fame given by the Internet Society (Global Connectors: "Recognizing individuals from around the world who have made significant contributions to the global growth and use of the Internet")
In 2012, a fish species was named after him, Etheostoma gore, for his environmental vision, commitment, and accomplishments throughout decades of public service and his role in educating the public and raising awareness on the issue of global climate change

2011 awards and honors
2011 Honorary Doctorate, Hamilton College

2010 awards and honors
2010 Honorary Doctorate, Tilburg University
2010 Honorary Doctorate, University of Tennessee-Knoxville

2009 awards and honors

2009 The Berkeley Medal from the University of California, Berkeley.
2009 Roger Revelle Prize from the Scripps Institution of Oceanography, University of California, San Diego
2009 NAACP Image Award - Chairman's Award (with Wangari Maathai)

Other
Gore wrote An Inconvenient Truth: The Planetary Emergency of Global Warming and What We Can Do About It, which won a Grammy Award for Best Spoken Word Album.

2008 awards and honors
2008 National Civil Rights Museum Freedom Award (Theme: "A Climate of Change"): "The National Civil Rights Museum, located at the Lorraine Motel, assassination site of Dr. Martin Luther King, Jr., chronicles key episodes of the American civil rights movement and the legacy of this movement to inspire participation in civil and human rights efforts globally, through our collections, exhibitions, and educational programs." Diane Nash will also be honored.
2008 Named one of Foreign Policy Magazine's Top 100 Public Intellectuals
2008 Honorary Doctorate in Humane Letters, Carnegie Mellon University
2008 Doctor honoris causa, École Polytechnique Fédérale de Lausanne
2008 Dan David Prize: "Social Responsibility with Particular Emphasis on the Environment"

2008 The Gore resolution (HJR712) passed by the Tennessee House of Representatives which honors Gore's "efforts to curb global warming"

2007 awards and honors

2007 Nobel Peace Prize with the Intergovernmental Panel on Climate Change (IPCC) (environment)
2007 Time Person of the Year: Runner - Up.
2007 Gothenburg Prize for Sustainable Development
2007 International Academy of Television Arts and Sciences: Founders Award (Emmy) for Current TV and for work in the area of global warming
2007 Quill Awards: History/current events/politics, The Assault on Reason
2007 Prince of Asturias Award in Spain (environment)
2007 The Sir David Attenborough Award for Excellence in Nature Filmmaking  (environment)
2007 Honorary Fellow, American Academy of Arts and Sciences
2007 Honorary Doctorate, Concordia University
2007 Honorary Doctorate, Aalborg University

Other
 Gore wrote, and starred in the 2006 documentary An Inconvenient Truth, which won an Academy Award for Best Documentary in 2007.

Additional awards
1999 Neutra Medal for Professional Excellence: In recognition for his contributions to the Environmental Design Profession and in honor of Modernist architect Richard Neutra.
2006 Quill Awards: History/current events/politics, An Inconvenient Truth
2005 Webby Award: Lifetime Achievement Award (interactive technology)
1998 The Computerworld Honors Program Honoring Those Who Use Information Technology to Benefit Society: Toshiba America Leadership Award for Education
1993 First Annual Cisco Systems Circle Award: "In recognition of his visionary leadership in building global awareness of computer networking through the National Information Highway Initiative"
1969 National Defense Service Medal

Notes

Awards
Lists of awards received by person